Ogunnowo Taiwo Oladuni is a Nigerian actress and a cosmetologist. Her first film is Ifejafunmi.

Filmography 

 Ifejafunmi
 Ebute
 Gucci Girls

Personal life 
In 2018, the actress married Nigerian movie producer Okiki Afolayan.

References 

Nigerian actresses
Year of birth missing (living people)
Living people